WLCI may refer to:

 Wigan and Leigh College, India, an Indian university
 WLCI-LP, radio station licensed to Nelsonville, Ohio